STS-42 was a NASA Space Shuttle Discovery mission with the Spacelab module. Liftoff was originally scheduled for 8:45 EST (13:45 UTC) on January 22, 1992, but the launch was delayed due to weather constraints. Discovery successfully lifted off an hour later at 9:52:33 EST (14:52:33 UTC). The main goal of the mission was to study the effects of microgravity on a variety of organisms. The shuttle landed at 8:07:17 PST (16:07:17 UTC) on January 30, 1992, on Runway 22, Edwards Air Force Base, California. STS-42 was the first of two flights in 1992 of Discovery, the second of which occurred during STS-53, which launched on December 2, 1992. The mission was also the last mission of the Space Shuttle Discovery to have a seven-member crew until STS-82, which was launched on February 11, 1997.

Crew

Crew seating arrangements

Crew notes 
The crew of STS-42 included West Germany's first astronaut, Ulf D. Merbold, who was making his second spaceflight, and Canada's first female astronaut, Roberta L. Bondar. In order to allow around-the-clock monitoring of experiments, the astronauts were divided into a red team and a blue team. Manley Lanier "Sonny" Carter Jr., was originally assigned to fly as mission specialist 3 for this mission, but died 7 months prior the launch in a plane crash. David Hilmers was then chosen to replace him.

Mission highlights 

STS-42 was launched on January 22, 1992, 9:52:33 a.m. EST. The launch was delayed by one hour due to weather constraints.

Discovery carried into orbit the International Microgravity Laboratory-1 (IML-1), a pressurized crewed Spacelab module, to explore in depth the complex effects of weightlessness on living organisms and materials processing. The international crew, divided into Red and Blue teams, conducted experiments on the human nervous system's adaptation to low gravity and the effects of microgravity on other life forms such as shrimp eggs, lentil seedlings, fruit fly eggs and bacteria. Low gravity materials processing experiments included crystal growth from a variety of substances such as enzymes, mercury iodine and a virus. Other payloads included 10 Get Away Special (GAS) canisters, a number of middeck payloads, two Shuttle Student Involvement Program (SSIP) experiments, and an Australian developed ultraviolet telescope Endeavour. Middeck payloads included Gelation of SOLS: Applied Microgravity Research (GOSAMR), Investigations into Polymer Membrane Processing (IPMP) and the Radiation Monitoring Experiment (RME-III).

The mission landed on January 30, 1992, 8:07:17 a.m. PST, Runway 22, Edwards Air Force Base, California, after being extended by a day for continued scientific experimentation. The orbiter returned to Kennedy Space Center on February 16, 1992.

Mission insignia 
The four stars in the lower blue field and two stars in the upper blue field of the insignia symbolize the flight's numerical designation in the Space Transportation System's mission sequence. The single gold star above the horizon on the right is in honor of astronaut Manley Lanier "Sonny" Carter Jr., who was killed in the crash of Atlantic Southeast Airlines Flight 2311 in Brunswick, Georgia while on a commercial airplane traveling for NASA. Carter was originally assigned as a mission specialist on STS-42 at the time of his death.

See also 

 List of human spaceflights
 List of Space Shuttle missions
 Destiny in Space, 1994 documentary primarily focused on STS-42
 Nikon NASA F4
 Outline of space science
 Space Shuttle

References

External links 

 NASA mission summary
 STS-42 Press Kit
 STS-42 Video Highlights 

Space Shuttle missions
Edwards Air Force Base
Spacecraft launched in 1992